Mayra Benita Alves Dias (born 28 September 1991) is a Brazilian model and beauty pageant titleholder. She was crowned Miss Brasil 2018 on 26 May 2018, becoming the second representative from Amazonas. She represented Brazil at the Miss Universe 2018, where she finished as a Top 20 semifinalist.

Early life
Dias was born in Itacoatiara, a city in the interior of the state of Amazonas. She has Indigenous ancestry.

Career

Miss Mundo Amazonas 2015
Dias was crowned Miss Mundo Amazonas 2015 and competed at the Miss Mundo Brasil 2015 in Florianópolis.

Miss Mundo Brasil 2015
Dias will represent Amazonas at the Miss Mundo Brasil 2015 at the Teatro Governador Pedro Ivo in Florianópolis in the state of Santa Catarina but she placed in the Top 20 semifinalist.

Reina Hispanoamericana 2016
Dias was joined and chosen as Brazilian Representative at Reina Hispanoamericana 2016 at the FexpoCruz, Santa Cruz, Bolivia on 5 November 2016 defeating 22 other beauties competing for the title where she ended as the 1st Runner-Up. It was Camila Soleibe from Colombia who eventually won the title Reina Hispanoamericana 2016.

Miss Brasil 2018
Dias representing Amazonas was crowned Miss Brasil 2018 held at the Riocentro in Rio de Janeiro its grand finale on 26 May 2018 where 27 beautiful divas competed for the national title. She succeeded outgoing Miss Brasil 2017 Monalysa Alcântara.

Miss Universe 2018
Dias represented Brazil at the Miss Universe 2018 pageant in Bangkok, Thailand, where she placed in the top 20.

References

External links

1991 births
Living people
People from Amazonas (Brazilian state)
Brazilian people of European descent
Brazilian people of indigenous peoples descent
Brazilian female models
Brazilian beauty pageant winners
Miss Brazil winners
Miss Universe 2018 contestants